The 1877 college football season had no clear-cut champion, with the Official NCAA Division I Football Records Book listing Yale and Princeton as having been selected national champions.

Conference standings

References